Dan Paul Benjamin (born October 26, 1972) is a software developer, user interface designer, writer, and podcaster. He is the founder of 5by5 and owner of Bacon Method.

Career
In 2010, Benjamin started 5by5 Studios, a podcast production outlet that currently produces nineteen shows, including several co-hosted shows such as Back to Work with Merlin Mann and The Ihnatko Almanac with Andy Ihnatko. Based on his popular podcasts, Benjamin has been called "the king of Apple talk radio" by Philip Elmer-DeWitt of Fortune Magazine and CNN. In the past, he co-founded Cork'd and Playgrounder, and wrote the CMS behind A List Apart. Additionally, he has made educational screencasts through PeepCode. Benjamin has appeared on the Fox News program Strategy Room – Gadgets and Games multiple times to discuss various topics.

In 2017, he released fireside.fm, a platform for podcasters. Benjamin holds a B.A. in Technical Writing with a Computer Science focus from the University of Central Florida.

References

External links
5by5
fireside.fm
Hivelogic
Bacon Method
Cork'd
PeepCode
Playgrounder
 Dan Benjamin on 5by5 
Interview with Dan about his Network Creation 

1972 births
Living people
University of Central Florida alumni
American computer programmers
American podcasters
American technology company founders
5by5 Studios